Until 1 January 2007 Sydals was a municipality (Danish, kommune) in South Jutland County on the southern part of the island of Als off the east coast of the Jutland peninsula in south Denmark. The municipality covered an area of 95 km2, and had a total population of 6,527 (2005).  Its last mayor was Jens Peter Kock. The site of its municipal council was the town of Hørup.  Other towns in the municipality were Høruphav, Lysabild, Mommark, Skovby, and Sønderby.

Ferry service connects the former municipality at the town of Mommark to the island of Ærø at the town of Søby.

 Hørup Parish
 Kegnæs Parish
 Lysabild Parish
 Tandslet Parish

Sydals municipality ceased to exist due to Kommunalreformen ("The Municipality Reform" of 2007).  It was combined with Augustenborg, Broager, Gråsten, Nordborg, Sundeved, and Sønderborg municipalities to form the new Sønderborg municipality.  This created a municipality with an area of 499 km2 and a total population of 49,886 (2005).  The new municipality belongs to  Region of Southern Denmark.

References 
 Municipal statistics: NetBorger Kommunefakta, delivered from KMD aka Kommunedata (Municipal Data)
 Municipal mergers and neighbors: Eniro new municipalities map

External links 
 Sønderborg municipality's official website (Danish, English and German)

Former municipalities of Denmark
Sønderborg Municipality